The Temple of Khonsu is an ancient Egyptian temple. It is located within the large Precinct of Amun-Re at Karnak, in Luxor, Egypt. The edifice is an example of an almost complete New Kingdom temple, and was originally constructed by Ramesses III on the site of an earlier temple. The gateway of this temple is at the end of the avenue of sphinxes that ran to the Luxor Temple. In Ptolemaic times, Ptolemy III Euergetes constructed a great gateway and enclosure wall for the temple; only the gateway now remains (see below). Inscriptions inside the forecourt of the temple were made in the time of Herihor.

The hypostyle hall was erected by Nectanebo I and is not of great size; inside were found two baboons that appear to have been carved in the time of Seti I. It probably belonged to the earlier building on the site.

Numerous blocks with unmatching and inverted decorations can be seen, showing the amount of reconstruction and reuse of material from the surrounding temple complexes, especially in Ptolemaic times.

From 2006 to 2018, the American Research Center in Egypt performed conservation work.

Bibliography
 The Epigraphic Survey, The Temple of Khonsu, volume 1, Chicago 1978, Oriental Institute Publications, volume 100
 The Epigraphic Survey, The Temple of Khonsu, volume 2, Chicago 1981, Oriental Institute Publications, volume 103
 Ad Thijs, The scenes of the High Priest Pinuzem in the Temple of Khonsu, Zeitschrift für Ägyptische Sprache 134 (2007), 50-63

Gallery of images

References

Karnak temple complex
Ramesses III
Khonsu